Abbasqulular may refer to:
Abbasqulular, Goranboy, Azerbaijan
Abbasqulular, Tovuz, Azerbaijan